Zero One may refer to:

 Zero 1 (band), a band
 "Zero One" (song), a 2018 song by K?d
 "Zero-One", a song by Northlane from the album Mesmer, 2017
 Pro Wrestling Zero1, a Japanese pro wrestling promotion
 Zero-One, the name of the vehicle in the Pokémon Snap video game
 Zero One, the name of the computer-controlled city in the Matrix trilogy
 Kamen Rider Zero-One, a 2019–20 Japanese tokusatsu series
 Zero One (TV series) British TV series in the early 1960s